The Jeannie River is a river located in Far North Queensland, Australia.

The river flows in a north easterly direction through mostly uninhabited country past Lagoon Prospect and then enters the Cape Melville National Park and eventually discharging into the Coral Sea almost adjacent to Howick Island. The river descends  over its  course.

See also

References

Rivers of Far North Queensland
Bodies of water of the Coral Sea